Zid (English: Stubbornness) is a Pakistani television drama series debuted on Hum TV on 26 December 2014. It is written by Bee Gul and, produced by Momina Duraid and directed by Adnan Wai. It features Maya Ali, Ahsan Khan, Rabab Hashim, Imran Peerzada and Nausheen Shah in pivotal roles.

Summary
Series follow the story of Saman, a professional working woman whose father's love and care has made her stubborn, albeit headstrong. Her conservative aunt, whose character is in complete contrast to Saman's, often tries to reach out to her. Saman gets engaged twice and both of the engagements break off due to Saman and for the second engagement she actually goes to the guys house herself to break off the engagement. Then following these incidents Saman's aunt, her fathers elder sister, comes with a proposal for her, of a man named Omar who is settled in USA but a divorcee. Her aunt decides not to tell Saman about Omar's previous marriage. Since Saman's stubbornness is well known in the family, her parents believe it best to get her married at this point in time and decide to accept Omar's proposal for Saman. On their wedding night, Omar decides to tell Saman of his past and Saman reacts badly to this news and tells her parents that she does not want to move to the USA.
However, her parents are unmoved by her attempts at blackmail and she moves with her husband to the home awaiting in U.S.A. There she meets the daughter of Mr.Qasim, who is like a father to Omar. They become friends and she shows Saman around. During this time we see how poor and grave the relationship is between Saman and Omar.

Plot

Part 1
Saman, a professional working woman whose father's love and care has made her stubborn, albeit headstrong. Her conservative aunt, whose character is in complete contrast to Saman's, often tries to reach out to her. Saman gets engaged twice and both of the engagements break off due to Saman and for the second engagement she actually goes to the guys house herself to break off the engagement. Then following these incidedents Saman's aunt, her fathers elder sister, comes with a proposal for her, of a man named Omar who is settled in USA but a divorcee. Her aunt decides not to tell Saman about Omar's previous marriage. Since Saman's stubbornness is well known in the family, her parents believe it best to get her married at this point in time and decide to accept Omar's proposal for Saman. On their wedding night, Omar decides to tell Saman of his past and saman reacts badly to this news and tells her parents that she does not want to move to the USA. But when her family tells her that they are now fed up of her behaviour, a deeply hurt Saman changes her decision and moves to U.S.A.

Part 2
There, she meets Rukhi, daughter of Qasim (who took real care of Omar since his childhood) and becomes best friends with her, Qasim and Saman share a great time and Qasim tells Saman about his terrible past that how he used his wife Julian, he tells that he started loving her and she died listening to this Saman gets really sad. Rukhi on the other hand is interested in a Guy named David and the fact he is an american disturbs Qasim a lot later onwards. Saman and Omer turn into a fight which leads Saman to leave her home, she starts living with Qasim and Rukhi. When Rukhi introduces Qasim to David, Qasim gets angry and throws him out of his house. This disturbs Rukhi who is now upset with her father, Saman recalls Qasim's past to him which leads him to react badly, Saman leaves the house.

Part 3
Saman now goes to her school friend Zainab's house who too shifted to USA, she usually depends on money mostly. She previously broke her relationship with her boyfriend named Michael and later, Michael asks her to patch up again which she fully denies. She and Saman are now good friends. Rukhi on the other hand leaves Qasim and tells him that she can live on her own, she leaves the house and Qasim is shown on to be bothered. Later onwards Qasim is shown to be sad. It is then revealed that Michael is not a good guy with whom Zainab is thinking to patch up. Zainab patches up with him who is just looking for her money. She later throws Sanam out of her house, Rukhi on the other hand is too shown to be thrown out. She goes to Qasim which makes matters worse and she again is kicked from there. Now both the girls are homeless.

Cast

 Ahsan Khan as Omer
 Maya Ali as Saman
 Nausheen Shah as Zanaib (Zee)
 Rabab Hashim As Rukhi 
 Shaz Khan As David 
 Humayoun Ashraf as Raza
 Huma Nawab as Omer's mother
 Sultana Zafar as Aapa Jan
 Kanwar Arsalan as Akbar
 Hina Javed as Sonia
 Usman Peerzada as Qasim

References

External links
 
 Zid All Episodes

Pakistani drama television series
2014 Pakistani television series debuts
2015 Pakistani television series endings
Urdu-language television shows
Hum TV original programming
Hum TV